Periploca otrebla is a moth in the family Cosmopterigidae. It was described by H.A. Vargas in 2003. It is found in Chile (Azapa Valley, Chaca valley).

The larvae feed on the leaves of Acacia macracantha.

References

Natural History Museum Lepidoptera generic names catalog

Moths described in 2003
Chrysopeleiinae
Moths of South America
Endemic fauna of Chile